Susan Gerhart is a semi-retired computer scientist.

Education
Susan Gerhart received her BA in Mathematics from Ohio Wesleyan University, her MS in Communication Sciences from University of Michigan, and her PhD in Computer Science from Carnegie Mellon University. She completed her thesis "Verification of APL Programs" in 1972 under thesis advisor Donald W. Loveland. She credited Sputnik with having inspired her to study science.

Career

Teaching
She has taught software engineering and computer science at Toronto, Duke University, Wang Institute of Graduate Studies, and Embry-Riddle Aeronautical University.

She established a project to develop curricula to increase security in aviation-oriented computing education. This project produced several papers and modules, including one on buffer overflow vulnerabilities.

Her other publications include "Toward a theory of test data selection", "An International Survey of Industrial Applications of Formal Methods. Volume 2. Case Studies", and "Do Web search engines suppress controversy?".

Systers
In 1987 Gerhart was one of the founding members of Systers, the oldest and largest mailing list for women in computing.

Macular Degeneration Advocacy
Having been personally impacted by macular degeneration, she maintains the "As Your World Changes" blog on using technology, including podcasts, to overcome vision loss. In 2009 she spoke at the IEEE conference on Software Testing, Verification and Validation on "The Disability/Mobility Challenge: Formulating Criteria for Testing Accessibility and Usability".

References

External links
 As Your World Changes blog
 John Udell's Interviews with Innovators podcast with Susan Gerhart

American computer scientists
Living people
American women computer scientists
Ohio Wesleyan University alumni
University of Michigan alumni
Carnegie Mellon University alumni
Year of birth missing (living people)